Payne Harry Ratner (October 3, 1896 – December 27, 1974) was an American lawyer serving as the 28th governor of Kansas from 1939 to 1943.

Biography
Born in Casey, Illinois, Ratner graduated from Blackwell High School in Oklahoma. During World War I he served as an ensign in the U.S. Navy. He earned a law degree at Washington University in St. Louis in 1920. He married Cliffe Dodd on August 21, 1920  and they had three children, Jurie, Teno, and Darb.

Career
Ratner practiced law in Sibley, Iowa, and then in Parsons, Kansas. In Parsons, he was the Labette County Attorney from 1923 to 1927. He was elected as a Republican to the Kansas Senate in 1929 and also served as state senator from 1937 to 1939.

Winning the 1938 Republican gubernatorial nomination and the election, Ratner was sworn in as Governor of Kansas on January 9, 1939. He was reelected in 1940. During his tenure, a department of labor was established, a department of revenue and taxation was organized, the highway commission was given authority over the vehicle department, a teacher's pension plan was implemented, a small permanent building fund for schools was authorized, and the state fire marshal's office, the hotel commission, and the inspector of restaurants were re-established. He left office on January 11, 1943, and retired from politics. In 1962 Ratner was indicted on unethical legal activities; the case was dismissed; and he was cleared of all charges.

Death
Ratner died in 1974 in Wichita, Kansas.

References

External links
 National Governors Association website
 Famous Folks of Parsons, Kansas
 
 The Political Graveyard
 Publications concerning Kansas Governor Ratner's administration available via the KGI Online Library

Republican Party governors of Kansas
Republican Party Kansas state senators
People from Casey, Illinois
Washington University School of Law alumni
American Disciples of Christ
Iowa lawyers
Kansas lawyers
People from Parsons, Kansas
1896 births
1974 deaths
People from Sibley, Iowa
20th-century American politicians